Deportiva Piloñesa is a Spanish football club based in Infiesto, Piloña, in the autonomous community of Asturias.

History
Founded in 1917, the club was consolidating in the village before promoting for the first time to Tercera División in 1980, playing 18 of the 22 next seasons in the league before declining and thus, being relegating to the lowest divisions due to bad performances. Piloñesa also participated in one edition of the Copa del Rey, being eliminated by Naval in the first round of the 1981–82 edition.

The last achievement of the club was the promotion to the sixth tier in 2018 against its rivals Europa Nava.

Season to season

18 seasons in Tercera División

References

External links
Piloñesa Facebook account

Football clubs in Asturias
Association football clubs established in 1917
1917 establishments in Spain